The United States Senate election of 1940 in New Jersey was held on November 5, 1940. 

Incumbent Republican Senator William Warren Barbour was re-elected over Democrat James H. R. Cromwell, who had recently been appointed United States Ambassador to Canada.

Republican primary

Candidates
William Warren Barbour, incumbent Senator since 1938
C. Dan Coskey, candidate for Senate in 1936 and 1938
George O. Pullen, candidate for Senate in 1938

Results

Democratic primary

Candidates
James H. R. Cromwell, United States Ambassador to Canada

Results

General election

Candidates
William Warren Barbour (Republican), incumbent Senator
George Breitman (Socialist Workers), activist and editor of The Militant
McAlister Coleman (Socialist), journalist and author
James H. R. Cromwell (Democrat), United States Ambassador to Canada
Mary E. Dooner (Communist)
Edson R. Leach (Prohibition)
Harry Santhouse (Socialist Labor)
James A. Tumulty (Constitutional)

Results

See also 
1940 United States Senate elections

Notes

References

New Jersey
1940
1940 New Jersey elections